Mahantha Thakur, is a Nepalese politician and president of Loktantrik Samajbadi Party Nepal, as well as the former treasurer of Nepali Congress Party. He has served Minister in various ministries including Ministry Of Science and Technology while in Nepali Congress.

Political career 
Mahanta Thakur, who was born in Ekarahiya in Pipara village municipality of Mahottari, has left the Nepali Congress and entered the politics of Madhes as the president of TMLOP. Thakur's political background is Congress. His journey to the Congress began in 2016  BS with student politics. Leaving the Congress treasurer and science and technology minister, he entered the politics of Madhesh in 2064 BS.

In the year 2026 BS, Thakur became the president of the Students' Union affiliated to the Nepali Congress. He is also a founding central member of the Nepal Students Association. He was arrested during his student days while protesting against King Mahendra's coup d'état.

Mahanta's political journey started from Janakpur. Although his birthplace was Mahottari, his field of work was Sarlahi. He used to work as a lawyer in Sarlahi. As well as advocacy, so was political activism.

He was elected from Sarlahi twice and was made Deputy Speaker of House of Representatives in 1991.

Personal life 
Thakur does not own land or a home. In Kathmandu, he lives with his daughter.

While staying in Sarlahi, Thakur's wife was injured when a stove exploded while she was cooking around 2045 BS. She died during the treatment. He was staying with his wife in a rental house in Sarlahi.

Thakur had two children and his son died in an accident. At that time, he was a medical student in BPKIHS, Dharan. His daughter is the daughter in law of former minister and governor Umakanta Jha.

Electoral history

2017 legislative elections

1999 Nepalese General Election

1994 Nepalese General Election

1991 Nepalese General Election

See also 

 Hridayesh Tripathi
 Terai Madhesh Loktantrik Party
 Nepali Congress

References

Living people
Nepali Congress politicians from Madhesh Province
1952 births
People from Mahottari District
Nepal MPs 2017–2022
Nepal MPs 1991–1994
Nepal MPs 1994–1999
Nepal MPs 1999–2002
Nepalese political party founders

Members of the 1st Nepalese Constituent Assembly
Terai Madhesh Loktantrik Party politicians
Rastriya Janata Party Nepal politicians
People's Socialist Party, Nepal politicians
Loktantrik Samajwadi Party, Nepal politicians
Nepal MPs 2022–present